Ruth Christ Sullivan (April 20, 1924 – September 16, 2021) was an American organizer and advocate for education for people with autism.

Activism 
In 1965 Sullivan was one of the founders of the Autism Society of America (formerly called the National Society for Autistic Children), and was its first elected president; she is also on the permanent honorary board of the society. Ruth Sullivan was founder and former executive director of the Autism Services Center, a nonprofit, licensed behavioral health care agency that she founded in Huntington, West Virginia in 1979. It now provides services in four counties to families who have a family member with developmental disabilities.  She retired from the Autism Services Center on November 1, 2007, at the age of 83.

Ruth Sullivan was one of the lobbyists for Public Law 94-142 (the Education of All Handicapped Children Act, now known as the Individuals with Disabilities Education Act, or IDEA), which guaranteed a public education to all children in the United States. Before the passage of the law, individual school districts in most states were allowed to choose whether they were willing to educate a child with disabilities.

She also helped found the West Virginia Autism Training Center at Marshall University, in Huntington, West Virginia, where her husband was a university professor.

She has given presentations in countries including Australia, South Africa, Kuwait, Argentina, the Netherlands and France. She has written articles on autism from the point of view of parents and of care providers, most recently in the Handbook of Autism and Pervasive Developmental Disorders (Wiley, 2005), edited by Fred Volkmar; she wrote the foreword to The Way I See It: A Personal Look at Autism and Asperger's (2008) by Temple Grandin, an adult with autism; she was the person who first asked Temple Grandin to speak in public about her autism. She is one of the founders of NARPAA, the National Association of Residential Providers for Adults with Autism.

Film 
Sullivan assisted in the production of the 1988 movie Rain Man by serving as a consultant on autistic behavior, and Dustin Hoffman worked with Sullivan and her son Joseph, who has autism, when practicing for his role. Hoffman thanked her and Joseph in his Oscar speech. Sullivan has the last credit in the movie, and the extended DVD version features an interview with Joe. Joe Sullivan was not the only inspiration for Hoffman's role; the role was originally written after writer Barry Morrow met savant Kim Peek. Other sources for the character of Raymond include Bill Sackter and Mark Rimland, son of Bernard Rimland.

Personal life 

Sullivan was trained as a Registered nurse at Charity Hospital (New Orleans). She served in the   United States Army Nurse Corps during World War II afterwards became a public health nurse. She later earned a B.S. in Public Health Nursing and in 1952 an M.A. in Public Health Administration, from Teachers College, Columbia University.
She had seven children, and was a Kentucky Colonel. She received a PhD from Ohio University in 1984.

She died in Huntington, West Virginia, on September 16, 2021, at the age of 97.

References

External links

1924 births
2021 deaths
American health activists
Autism activists
Marshall University people
Activists from West Virginia
People from Huntington, West Virginia
Activists from Louisiana
People from Acadia Parish, Louisiana
Ohio University alumni
Teachers College, Columbia University alumni
Nurses from West Virginia
United States Army Nurse Corps officers
21st-century American women
American women nurses